This is a list of Crayon Shin-chan episodes that aired from 1992 to 2001.

Episode list

1992

1993

1994

1995

1996

1997

1998

1999

2000

2001

References

Crayon Shin-chan
Crayon Shin-chan